Bebearia laetitia, or Laetitia's forester, is a butterfly in the family Nymphalidae. It is found in Guinea, Sierra Leone, Liberia, Ivory Coast, Ghana, Nigeria, Cameroon, Gabon, the Republic of the Congo, the Central African Republic, Democratic Republic of the Congo and Uganda. The habitat consists of wetter forests.

Subspecies
Bebearia laetitia laetitia (Guinea, Sierra Leone, Liberia, Ivory Coast, Ghana, Nigeria, Cameroon, Gabon, Congo, Uganda, Democratic Republic of the Congo: Mongala, Uele, Tshopo, Equateur and Lualaba)
Bebearia laetitia vesta Hecq, 1989 (Central African Republic, Democratic Republic of the Congo: Sankuru)

References

Butterflies described in 1880
laetitia
Butterflies of Africa